Jiang Jingshan (February 1936 – 27 June 2021) was a Chinese aerospace engineer with expertise in microwave remote sensing and spaceflight engineering. He had been the director of the Center for Space Science and Applied Research, Chinese Academy of Sciences, deputy chief designer of the Chinese Lunar Exploration Program and an aerospace expert of China's 863 Program. He was an academician of Chinese Academy of Engineering, International Eurasian Academy of Sciences and a member of CN COSPAR.

Jiang is of Korean descent and was born in February 1936, in Longjing, in Yanbian Korean Autonomous Prefecture, Jilin Province, Manchukuo. He became the first Chinese scientist in researching microwave remote sensing technology after he participated in the creation of China's first satellite, Dong Fang Hong I. He was the founder of China's National Microwave Remote Sensing Laboratory (NMRS), Chinese Academy of Science.

Personal life
Jiang was married to Chen Zenghui; they have two children.

References

1936 births
2021 deaths
Members of the Chinese Academy of Engineering
Engineers from Jilin
Chinese people of Korean descent
People from Yanbian
Chinese aerospace engineers
20th-century Chinese engineers
21st-century Chinese engineers